Jonge Garde is a Disney Channel original television series, originally broadcast in the Netherlands and Belgium. Jonge Garde started on October 26, 2015. The series consists of two seasons for a total of 43 episodes, each of 11 to 12 minutes. The cast consists entirely of Dutch and Flemish actors.

In Wallonia, the voices are dubbed into French. The series was also dubbed and broadcast in France and Italy.

Cast

Release
The series first aired on October 26, 2015, with the last episode of the first season airing on December 3, 2015. The second season premiered on November 7, 2016 and ran until December 1, 2016.

References

External links
 

Dutch-language television shows
2015 Dutch television series debuts
2016 Dutch television series endings
2010s Dutch television series